Kazushige (written: , ,  or ) is a masculine Japanese given name. Notable people with the name include:

, Japanese writer
, software engineer
, Japanese footballer
, Japanese cyclist
, Japanese baseball player and television personality
, Japanese video game writer
, Japanese professional wrestler
, Japanese weightlifter
, Japanese general and politician
, Japanese rower

Japanese masculine given names